Saša Ciani (born 25 March 2003) is a Slovenian professional basketball player for Cedevita Junior of the Croatian League. He is a 2.09 m tall power forward.

Professional career
Ciani started playing professional basketball for Koper Primorska. On 12 October 2020, Ciani signed with the Serbian team Dynamic VIP PAY and played in 21 games in the Serbian national championship. He previously played in the 2019–20 Slovenian national under-19 championship.

On 18 August 2021, Ciani signed a four-year contract with Cedevita Olimpija. A year later, in August 2022, Ciani was loaned to Cedevita Junior.

National team career
Ciani made his debut for the Slovenian national team in August 2022 in a friendly match against the Netherlands, and was also included in the preliminary roster for EuroBasket 2022.

References

External links
 Profile at Eurobasket.com
 RealGM.com profile
 Proballers.com profile

2003 births
Living people
People from Šempeter pri Gorici
ABA League players
KD Ilirija players
KK Cedevita Junior players
KK Cedevita Olimpija players
KK Dynamic players
Power forwards (basketball)
Slovenian expatriate basketball people in Croatia
Slovenian expatriate basketball people in Serbia
Slovenian men's basketball players